Thelymitra rubra, commonly called the salmon sun orchid or pink sun orchid, is a species of orchid endemic to southeastern Australia. It has a single thin, grass-like leaf and up to five salmon pink flowers with broad, toothed arms on the sides of the column. It is similar to T. carnea but the flowers are larger and the column arms are a different shape.

Description
The flowers are sometimes other shades of pink, rarely cream-coloured or very pale pink. The lobe on the top of the anther is short and brownish with a toothed tip. The side arms on the column are broad and yellow with finger-like edges. The flowers open on sunny days but are sometimes self-pollinating. Flowering occurs from September to November.

This species of sun orchid is similar to T. carnea but can be distinguished from that species by its larger flowers, salmon pink (rather than bright pink) colouration, and fringed column arms.

Taxonomy and naming
Thelymitra rubra was first formally described in 1882 by Robert Fitzgerald and the description was published in The Gardeners' Chronicle. The specific epithet (rubra) is a Latin word meaning "red".

Distribution and habitat
The salmon sun orchid grows in forest, heath and coastal scrub. It occurs in southern New South Wales, south-eastern South Australia and in Tasmania but is most widespread and common in all but the north-west of Victoria. Tasmanian specimens usually have a few hair-like strands on the sides of the column.

References

External links
 

rubra
Endemic orchids of Australia
Orchids of New South Wales
Orchids of South Australia
Orchids of Victoria (Australia)
Orchids of Tasmania
Plants described in 1882
Taxa named by William Vincent Fitzgerald